Floc'h, Floch, ar Floc'h and ar Floc'hig (frenchized in Le Floc'h, Le Floc'hic or even Le Page and Lécuyer) is a Breton family name meaning « the page ». It can refer to:
	
Anthony Floch, French rugby union player
Henri Le Floch, Breton rector of the French Seminary (Collège Français) in Rome 
Jean-Claude Floch, French cartoonist, known as Floc'h.
Louis Floch, Breton football player
Xavier Le Floch, Breton triathlete 
Maodez Glandour, pseudonym of Louis Augustin Le Floc'h (1909 -1986), Breton writer, poet and music composer
Jean Floc'h (1938-2007), Breton industrialist
Jean-Guy Le Floch (born in 1953), Breton entrepreneur, CEO Armor-Lux
Loïk Le Floch-Prigent (born in 1943), Breton business personality

Miscellaneous 
Floch Forster, a fictional character in the anime/manga series Attack on Titan
 145445 Le Floch, un asteroid

Breton-language surnames